Matković is a  Croatian and Serbian surname, a patronymic derived from the masculine given name Matko. It may refer to:

 Dobrica Matković (1888–1973), Yugoslav politician
 Draga Matković (1907–2013), Croatian-born German classical pianist
 Gordana Matković (born 1960), Serbian politician
 Hrvoje Matković (1923–2010), Croatian historian
 Ivica Matković (football coach) (born 1953), Croatian football coach
 Ivica Matković (Ustaša) (1913–1945), Ustaša lieutenant colonel and concentration camp commandant
 Blanka Matković (born 1976), Croatian historian

In popular culture
 Kristijan Matković, a Serbian soldier in a video game Battlefield 3

See also
Matkić

Croatian surnames
Serbian surnames